Late Night Special is the second studio album by Pretty Ricky. It was released on January 23, 2007. The album debuted atop the US Billboard 200 chart, selling over 132,000 copies in its first week. In its second week on the chart, it fell to #5 with 62,000 copies in the United States. The album has since been certified Gold by the RIAA.

Singles
The first single from the album is "On the Hotline" and a video for the song was released January 7, 2007 as a new joint on BET. The other singles were "Push It Baby" and "Love Like Honey". Another single "Wet Dreams" was released in late 2007.

Track listing

Charts

Weekly charts

Year-end charts

References

2007 albums
Pretty Ricky albums
Atlantic Records albums